Joseph Rea (born August 2, 1958) is a Canadian male curler and coach.

Record as a coach of national teams

References

External links

Joe Rea, coach | Canadian Paralympic Committee (web archive)
Joe Rea | Canadian Paralympic Committee

Rea earns HOF honour - Curling Canada

Living people
1958 births
Curlers from Vancouver
Canadian male curlers
Canadian curling coaches